The Little Riders is a book by Margaretha Shemin, that was made into a television movie in 1996 which aired on the Disney Channel. It tells the story of Joanna Hunter, a young Dutch-American girl who goes to visit her grandparents in the Netherlands, when the Nazis occupy the village. Joanna must protect the statues in the town's clock tower of the freedom fighters who defended the village, when the Nazis threaten to destroy them.

The movie had a mix of British and international talent. Johanna was played by Noley Thornton. Fellow American Luke Edwards also starred. British Legends like Paul Scofield, Rosemary Harris and Malcolm McDowell were the adult leads. Derek de Lint, Renée Soutendijk, Hidde Maas and Wim Serlie also starred from the Netherlands along with other Brits such as Benedick Blythe, Christopher Villiers and Martin Delaney in smaller roles. Some of the scenes were filmed in the village of De Rijp (the Netherlands) in the summer of 1995.

External links
 

1996 television films
1996 films
Disney Channel original films
Films set in the Netherlands
American World War II films
American children's films
Films directed by Kevin Connor
Films scored by Lee Holdridge
1990s American films